Wheal Prosper was a tin mine in Cornwall, England, a short distance from the hamlet of Rinsey and about  west of Porthleven. The ruined engine house remains, overlooking Mount's Bay near Rinsey Head. The site is a Scheduled Monument, and the engine house is a Grade II listed building.

History and description
The mine opened circa 1860 to exploit the Porthclew lode; it closed in 1866. It was acquired by the National Trust in 1969 and preserved.

The building housed an engine of cylinder diameter 30 inches, to pump water from the mine. It has three storeys; it is built of killas rubble, with dressed granite quoins, and the chimney has an upper section of brick.

See also

 Wheal Trewavas
 Mining in Cornwall and Devon
 Cornwall and West Devon Mining Landscape

References

Tin mines in Cornwall
Scheduled monuments in Cornwall
Grade II listed buildings in Cornwall
National Trust properties in Cornwall